Elanthankuzhi is a Local Panchayat in Alathur Taluk, Perambalur District, Tamil Nadu state, India. The town is located 17 km from the Taluk administrative office, and 24 km from the district headquarters. The nearest city is Ariyalur (6 km).

The Elanthankuzhi panchayat includes the villages Elanthankuzhi and Siranatham.

Elanthankuzhi is a village in Alathur Taluk in Perambalur District of Tamil Nadu State, India. It is located 23 km towards East from District headquarters Perambalur. 14 km from Alathur. 290 km from State capital Chennai

Elanthankuzhi Pin code is 621708 and postal head office is Kunnam (Perambalur).

Koothur ( 3 km ), Pilimisai ( 4 km ), Gudalur ( 5 km ), Adhanur ( 5 km ), Kottarai ( 6 km ) are the nearby Villages to Elanthankuzhi. Elanthankuzhi is surrounded by Alathur Taluk towards west, Veppur Taluk towards North, Perambalur Taluk towards west, Sendurai Taluk towards East .

Perambalur, ariyalur are the nearby Cities to Elanthankuzhi.	

Demographics of Elanthankuzhi

Tamil is the Local Language here. 
Politics in Elanthankuzhi

DMK, AIADMK,PMK,NTK are the major political parties in this area. 
Polling Stations /Booths near Elanthankuzhi West school

1)Panchayat Union Elementary School Building Terraced East West Building East Portion North Facing 
2)Panchayat Union Elementary School East West Terreaced Building Ssa South Facing East Side 
3)Panchayat Union Elementary School West East Terraced Building North Facing 
4)Panchayat Union Middle School Main Tiled Building West Portion South Facing 
5)Panchayat Union Middle School North South Terraced Ssa Building East Facing South Portion Alathiyur 
HOW TO REACH Elanthankuzhi

By Rail

Ariyalur Rail Way Station nearly 6 km, Sillakkudi Rail Way Station are the very nearby railway stations to Elanthankuzhi. How ever	Thanjavar Rail Way Station is major railway station 50 km near to Elanthankuzhi

Colleges near Elanthankuzhi

Dhanalakshmi srinivasan, Rover and Varatharaja Group of Education institutes.

Pums Elanthankuzhi (west)
Address : elanthankuzhi, alathur, perambalur, Tamil Nadu . PIN- 621708, Post - Kunnam (Perambalur)

Elanthankuzhi has government primary and middle schools.

Villages in Perambalur district